Hamada Al-Zubairi (born 1 June 1990) is a Yemeni footballer who plays for Al-Ahli San'a' and the Yemen national football team.

Career

Oman

Officially securing a move to Saham Club of the Oman Professional League in early 2016 with his contract lasting until 10 May that year, Al-Zubairi assisted his team in their 2015–16 Sultan Qaboos Cup run, winning the final 1-0. Before that, he was linked to four clubs.

International
The captain of the Yemen national team lists the game against Iraq as the peak of his international career.

References

External links 
 at National-Football-Teams

1990 births
Living people
People from Sanaa
Yemeni footballers
Association football defenders
Al-Ahli Club Sana'a players
Saham SC players
Yemeni League players
Oman Professional League players
Yemen international footballers
Yemeni expatriate footballers
Yemeni expatriate sportspeople in Oman
Expatriate footballers in Oman